This is a list of Colorado Buffaloes football players in the NFL Draft.

Key

Selections

References

Colorado

Colorado Buffaloes NFL Draft